Eesti Loodus ('Nature of Estonia') is magazine published in Estonia. It focuses on topics related to nature of Estonia.

Magazine is published by Loodusajakiri MTÜ and it is funded also by Environmental Investment Centre.

First number published in 1933. Between 1942–1957 publishing of magazine was stopped.

Since 2001 the editor-in-chief of Eesti Loodus is Toomas Kukk.

References

External links
 

Magazines published in Estonia
Environment of Estonia
Magazines established in 1933
1933 establishments in Estonia
Monthly magazines